Hancock County is the name of ten counties in the United States. All are named for John Hancock who was a leader in the American Revolution. The counties are:

 Hancock County, Georgia
 Hancock County, Illinois
 Hancock County, Indiana
 Hancock County, Iowa
 Hancock County, Kentucky
 Hancock County, Maine
 Hancock County, Mississippi
 Hancock County, Ohio
 Hancock County, Tennessee
 Hancock County, West Virginia

Formerly 

 Winston County, Alabama, named Hancock County until 1858